War in the Highlands is a 1999 internationally co-produced war drama film directed by Francis Reusser starring Marion Cotillard. The film was selected as the Swiss entry for the Best Foreign Language Film at the 71st Academy Awards, but was not accepted as a nominee. The film is based on the 1915 novel La Guerre dans le Haut-Pays by Charles-Ferdinand Ramuz concerning Switzerland in the Napoleonic era.

Cast
 Marion Cotillard as Julie Bonzon
 Yann Trégouët as David Aviolat
 François Marthouret as Josias Aviolat
 Antoine Basler as Ansermoz
 Patrick Le Mauff as Tille
 Jacques Michel as Jean Bonzon
 Jean-Pierre Gos as Pastor

See also
 List of submissions to the 71st Academy Awards for Best Foreign Language Film
 List of Swiss submissions for the Academy Award for Best Foreign Language Film

References

External links
 

1999 films
1999 drama films
1990s war drama films
Swiss war drama films
French war drama films
Belgian war drama films
1990s French-language films
Napoleonic Wars films
Films directed by Francis Reusser
French-language Swiss films
French-language Belgian films
1990s French films